Parsonsia capsularis is a climbing plant endemic to New Zealand belonging to the dogbane family Apocynaceae.

Despite its common name, the species is not a "true jasmine" and not of the genus Jasminum.

Taxonomy
Parsonsia capsularis was first named and described as Periploca capsularis by Georg Forster in 1786 and in 1809 was assigned by Robert Brown to his newly described genus, Parsonsia.

Etymology
The specific epithet, capsularis. derives from the Latin, capsula (small box - capsule) and means bearing capsules, producing capsules, or capsular-fruited.

See also
Flora of New Zealand

References

External links
Plantillustrations.org Parsonsia capsularis.

capsularis
Flora of New Zealand
Taxa named by Robert Brown (botanist, born 1773)
Plants described in 1786